The Little Minam River is a tributary of the Minam River in Union County in the U.S. state of Oregon. It begins at the base of Cartwheel Ridge in the Wallowa Mountains and flows generally north through the Wallowa–Whitman National Forest to meet the main stem river at the north end of Backbone Ridge.

Recreation
Open from August through December, it has sites for tent and trailer camping and horse camping. Amenities include toilets and picnic tables but no drinking water.

The Moss Springs Trailhead, near the campground, provides access to a network of trails through the forest around the Minam and Little Minam. Amenities include parking and a toilet but no drinking water.

Tributaries
The named tributaries of the Little Minam River from source to mouth are Dobbin, Fireline, and Horseshoe creeks, which enter from the left; Grizzly Creek, right; Threemile and Huckleberry creeks, left; Boulder Creek, right; Big Canyon, left; and Grouse and Black creeks, left.

See also
 List of rivers of Oregon

References

External links
Grande Ronde Model Watershed

Rivers of Oregon
Rivers of Union County, Oregon